The Liga Primera de Nicaragua is the top division of football in Nicaragua, organized by the Federación Nicaragüense de Fútbol, it was created in 1933.

It is played in two parts, Torneo de Apertura from August through November and Torneo de Clausura from January through May. Each of the regular seasons is followed by a playoff of the top four teams over a two-legged semifinal and subsequent final. The relegation end has the bottom team of the aggregate table dropped as well as the loser of the playoff of the 8th and 9th-place teams.

Current teams

2018–19 Primera División

Statistics

Champions
Teams in bold are currently participating in Primera División de Nicaragua.

Records
Following are records in Liga Primera de Nicaragua:
  Manuel "Catarrito" Cuadra (highest goal scorer in the league with 142 goals)
  Oscar "Chiqui" Calvo (most goals in a season with 44 goals in 1967 playing for Flor de Caña in the old format of the game)
  Sergio Gago (most goals in a season in the new format with 35 in 1999)
  José María Bermúdez (most goals in one game with nine in 1999)
 Marvin González (fastest goal 15 seconds playing for San Marcos against Real Estelí)

Previous winners

1933  : Alas (Managua)
1934 : Club Atlético (Managua)
1935−38 : not played
1939 : Lido
1940 : Diriangén (Diriamba)
1941 : Diriangén (Diriamba)
1942 : Diriangén (Diriamba)
1943 : Diriangén (Diriamba)
1944 : Diriangén (Diriamba)
1945 : Diriangén (Diriamba)
1946 : Ferrocarril (Managua)
1947 : Colegio C-A
1948 : Ferrocarril (Managua)
1949 : Diriangén (Diriamba)
1950 : Aduana
1951 : Aduana
1952 : unknown
1953 : Diriangén (Diriamba)
1954 : La Salle
1955 : Aduana
1956 : Diriangén (Diriamba)
1957 : not played
1958 : Club Atlético
1959 : Diriangén (Diriamba)
1960 : La Nica
1961 : Deportivo Santa Cecilia (Diriamba)
1962−64 : not played
1965 : Deportivo Santa Cecilia (Diriamba)
1966 : Flor de Caña (Chichigalpa)
1967 : Flor de Caña (Chichigalpa)
1968 : UCA (Managua)
1969 : Diriangén (Diriamba)
1970 : Diriangén (Diriamba)
1971 : Deportivo Santa Cecilia (Diriamba)
1972 : Deportivo Santa Cecilia (Diriamba)
1973 : Deportivo Santa Cecilia (Diriamba)
1974 : Diriangén (Diriamba)
1975 : UCA (Managua)
1976 : UCA (Managua)
1977 : UCA (Managua)
1978−79 : not played
1980 : Búfalos (Rivas)
1981 : Diriangén (Diriamba)
1982 : Diriangén (Diriamba)
1983 : Diriangén (Diriamba)
1984 : Deportivo Masaya (Masaya)
1985 : América (Managua)
1986 : Deportivo Masaya (Masaya)
1987 : Diriangén (Diriamba)
1988 : América (Managua)
1989 : Diriangén (Diriamba)
1990 : América (Managua)
1991 : Real Estelí
1992 : Diriangén (Diriamba)
1993 : Juventus (Managua)
1994 : Juventus (Managua)
1994−95 : Diriangén (Diriamba)
1995−96 : Diriangén (Diriamba)
1996−97 : Diriangén (Diriamba)
1997−98 : Walter Ferretti (Managua)
1998−99 : Real Estelí
1999−00 : Diriangén (Diriamba)
2000−01 : Walter Ferretti (Managua)
2001−02 : Deportivo Jalapa
2002−03 : Real Estelí
2003−04 : Real Estelí
2004−05 : Diriangén (Diriamba)
2005−06 : Diriangén (Diriamba)
2006−07 : Real Estelí
2007−08 : Real Estelí
2008−09 : Real Estelí
2009−10 : Real Estelí
2010−11 : Real Estelí
2011−12 : Real Estelí
2012−13 : Real Estelí
2013−14 : Real Estelí
2014−15 : Walter Ferretti (Managua)
2015−16 : Real Estelí
2016−17 : Real Estelí
2017 Apertura : Walter Ferretti (Managua)
2018 Clausura : Diriangén (Diriamba)
2018 Apertura : Managua
2019 Clausura : Real Estelí
2019 Apertura : Real Estelí
2020 Clausura : Real Estelí
2020 Apertura : Real Estelí
2021 Clausura : Diriangén (Diriamba)
2021 Apertura : Diriangén (Diriamba)
2022 Clausura : Diriangén (Diriamba)

References

External links
 Rec.Sports.Soccer Statistics Foundation
 Elnuevodiario

 
1
Nicaragua